Prague–Kbely Airport (Czech: letiště Praha–Kbely) (ICAO: LKKB) is a military airport located in Kbely, in the northeast municipal district of Prague, Czech Republic. Once Prague's principal airport, it is now used mainly as a military base for the Czech Air Force.

Kbely airfield is no longer used as a front-line Czech Air Force base, but it is utilised by military transport aircraft of the Czech Air Force, and the VIP aircraft which are used to transport Czech politicians. Prague Aviation Museum is also located at this airport, with a collection that includes 275 aircraft.

History 
Kbely Airport was built in 1918 and was Prague's only airport until the construction of Ruzyně Airport in 1937, on the northwest side of the city. It was the first Czechoslovak military airfield, and during the inter-war period was the venue for several major public air shows. The first scheduled flight operated by Czechoslovak Airlines departed from Kbely for Bratislava in October 1923.

See also 
 Prague Aviation Museum

References

Kbely
Kbely Airport
Buildings and structures in Prague
Airports established in 1918
1918 establishments in Czechoslovakia
Military airbases
20th-century architecture in the Czech Republic